Plasmodium vastator is a species of apicomplexan parasite in the family Plasmodiidae. The vertebrate hosts for this parasite are reptiles.

Description 

The parasite was first described by Telford in 1995. The schizonts give rise to 4 - 8 merozoites. The gametocytes are elongated.

Distribution 

This species occurs in the Philippines.

Hosts 

This species infects the agamid lizard Draco volans.

References 

vastator